The Utah State Aggies are a college football team that competes in the Mountain West Conference (MWC) of the Football Bowl Subdivision (FBS) of NCAA Division I, representing Utah State University. The Utah State college football program began in 1892 and has played home games at Merlin Olsen Field at Maverik Stadium since 1968. They have won thirteen conference championships in four different conferences during their history, most recently in 2021.

On December 12, 2020, Blake Anderson was hired as the Aggies' head coach, replacing Gary Andersen, who was fired 3 games into the 2020 season.

The Aggies have played in 16 bowl games in their history, winning six: the 2021 LA Bowl against the Oregon State Beavers, the 2018 New Mexico Bowl against the North Texas Mean Green, the 2014 New Mexico Bowl against the UTEP Miners, the 2013 Poinsettia Bowl against the Northern Illinois Huskies, the 2012 Famous Idaho Potato Bowl against the Toledo Rockets and the 1993 Las Vegas Bowl against Ball State.

History

Early history

The first intercollegiate athletic event in Utah State University's history took place on November 25, 1892, when the Agriculturalists defeated the football team from the University of Utah, 12–0. The game was played on what is now the quad, and it was the only game until 1896. The Aggies enjoyed early regional dominance, notching their first perfect season (7–0) in 1907. In 1911, under head coach Clayton Teetzel, the team again finished undefeated, even shutting out each of its five opponents by a collective score of 164–0. Hall of Fame. The makeshift field on the quad continued to serve the team until 1913, when football was moved to Adams Field, two blocks west of campus, where Adams Park now sits. The new field represented an improvement, but the facilities remained meager, which fact became more apparent with the success of Coach E. L. "Dick" Romney, who came to Logan in 1918. Romney, for whom the current football stadium is named, earned the team's first-ever conference championship in 1921, and compiled a 128–91–16 record in 29 seasons.

Recent history
The program continued a rich legacy throughout the early and mid-20th century, when the program produced a large number of athletes who went on to play in the NFL, including the legendary brothers and consensus All-Americans Merlin Olsen and Phil Olsen, who played for the Aggies. It was during this time that Utah State finished two seasons with year-end Top 25 rankings: No. 10 in 1961 and No. 19 in 1972.

Following the great heights of the 1960s and 70s, Aggie football fell upon hard times. Many longtime Aggie supporters attribute the decline to administrators at both Utah and BYU freezing then-superior USU out of the newly forming WAC. However, other factors cited as leading to the decline include a failure to upgrade facilities until recently, a lack of donors to athletics, complacency of past athletics directors, and instability in conferences.

After continual failed attempts to join the WAC, the program played as an independent program from 1962 to 1977 (until joining the PCAA/Big West in 1978). The program again played as an independent from 2001 to 2002 before joining the geographically distant Sun Belt Conference after the Big West Conference, which had housed the Aggies since 1978, elected to stop sponsoring football in 2001. USU's other teams remained in that conference until the school was finally invited to join the WAC in 2005. Despite having lobbied to join its in-state rivals Utah and BYU in the WAC for many decades prior to 2005, the Aggies gained membership only after the two other schools had left to form the Mountain West Conference. Later on, Utah State joined the Mountain West Conference in July 2013, again following departures by Utah and BYU.

Gary Andersen era (2009–2012)
In December 2008, Gary Andersen became the head coach of the Aggies, replacing Brent Guy following the unsuccessful 2008 season. Andersen would led the team to new heights. In 2011, he led the team to the Famous Idaho Potato Bowl and the team's first winning season since 1997. The 2012 team found far greater success, notching the school's first double-digit win season, the first outright conference championship since 1936, a return to the Famous Idaho Potato Bowl for the first bowl win in 19 years, and a national Top 25 ranking in three major ranking systems: the AP poll, the ESPN/USA Today poll, and the BCS.

Andersen left the program following the 2012 season to become the new head coach for the University of Wisconsin.

Matt Wells era (2013–2018)
In December 2012, Matt Wells, Andersen's former offensive coordinator, was hired as the new head coach of the Utah State Aggies. Wells coached the Aggies in their inaugural year as members of the Mountain West Conference. Despite multiple injuries to offensive starters, the Aggies were able to gain a berth to the first Mountain West Conference Football Championship Game, which they lost to Fresno State by a score of 17–24. Coach Wells was awarded the Mountain West Coach of the Year award and the Aggies defeated Northern Illinois in the Poinsettia Bowl by a score of 21–14. At the conclusion of the 2018 regular season, Matt Wells left to accept the head coaching job at Texas Tech University.

Return of Gary Andersen (2019–2020)

After Matt Wells left for Texas Tech following the 2018 season, Gary Andersen returned as head coach of the Utah State Aggies, beginning his second stint as Utah State's head coach in 2019. On November 7, 2020, Andersen and Utah State agreed to part ways after starting 0–3 during the 2020 season. Defensive coordinator Frank Maile was named the interim head coach of the Utah State Aggies for the remainder of the season.

Blake Anderson era (2021–present)
On December 12, 2020, Blake Anderson was hired as the head coach of the Utah State Aggies football team, replacing Gary Andersen following an unsuccessful 2020 season. In his first season at the helm, Anderson guided the team to a 9—3 regular season record, good for the Mountain Division championship, as well as the conference championship with a victory over San Diego State.

Conference affiliations
Utah State has been affiliated with multiple conferences and played as an independent.
 Independent (1892–1901)
 Colorado Football Association (1902–1908)
 Unknown (1909–1913)
 Rocky Mountain Athletic Conference (1914–1937)
 Mountain States Conference (1938–1961)
 University Division Independent (1962–1972)
 Division I Independent (1973–1977)
 Pacific Coast Athletic Association / Big West Conference (1978–2000)
 Division I-A Independent (2001–2002)
 Sun Belt Conference (2003–2004)
 Western Athletic Conference (2005–2012)
 Mountain West Conference (2013–present)

Championships

Conference championships
The Aggies have won thirteen conference championships in their history, most recently winning the Mountain West championship (2021).

† Co-champions

Division championships
The Aggies are in the Mountain Division of the Mountain West Conference and have been since the 2013 season, their inaugural season in the conference.

Head coaches
Head coaches of Utah State.

 No coach (1892)
 No team (1893–1895)
 J. Walter Mayo (1896)
 No team (1897)
 Samuel Dunning (1898)
 Willard Langton (1899–1900)
 Dick Richards (1901)
 George P. Campbell (1902–1906)
 Mysterious Walker (1907–1908)
 Clayton Teetzel (1909–1915)
 Jack Watson (1916–1917)
 No team (1918)
 Dick Romney (1919–1942)
 No team (1943)
 Dick Romney (1944–1948)
 George Melinkovich (1949–1950)
 John Roning (1951–1954)
 Ev Faunce (1955–1958)
 John Ralston (1959–1962)
 Tony Knap (1963–1966)
 Chuck Mills (1967–1972)
 Phil Krueger (1973–1975)
 Bruce Snyder (1976–1982)
 Chris Pella (1983–1985)
 Chuck Shelton (1986–1991)
 Charlie Weatherbie (1992–1994)
 John L. Smith (1995–1997)
 Dave Arslanian (1998–1999)
 Mick Dennehy (2000–2004)
 Brent Guy (2005–2008)
 Gary Andersen (2009–2012)
 Matt Wells (2013–2018)
 Frank Maile † (2018)
 Gary Andersen (2019–2020)
 Frank Maile † (2020)
 Blake Anderson (2021–present)

† Interim

Bowl games
The Utah State Aggies have played in 16 bowl games (15 NCAA-sanctioned) with a record of 6–10.

 The Grape Bowl is listed in NCAA records, but was not an NCAA-sanctioned bowl game.

Stadium

Utah State's home games are played on Merlin Olsen Field at Maverik Stadium.

The Aggies have played their home games at various spots around campus during their history with the current location housing Utah State Football since 1968. Previously named Romney Stadium for Dick Romney, Utah State's all-time winningest football coach and former athletics director, Romney Stadium was officially dedicated on September 27, 1969. The first game in Romney Stadium history came a season earlier in 1968, when Utah State defeated New Mexico State, 28–12 on September 14. Previous to the current stadium, the Aggies played at another, smaller venue also called "Romney Stadium", which was situated on the site where the HPER building now stands.

On December 5, 2009, Utah State University announced that the playing field at then Romney Stadium would be named Merlin Olsen Field, in honor of the Pro and College Football Hall of Fame member and former Aggie. A statue of Olsen in a plaza south of the stadium was dedicated to his memory in Fall 2010.

On April 11, 2015, Utah State University announced a corporate naming-rights partnership with Maverik, Inc., owners of convenience stores throughout the Intermountain West. The renaming of the stadium corresponds with a massive renovation project expected to be completed in time for the start of the 2016 football season. "Renovations to Maverik Stadium will focus on greatly improving the overall fan experience. On the west side, a new four-story premium seating and press box structure will be built to include a state-of-the-art media and game operations area, 24 luxury suites, 20 loge boxes, more than 700 covered club seats and a premium club area that will also be used to host a student-athlete training table. Major concourse work will include significantly increased restrooms, upgraded concessions and an enlarged concourse for better pedestrian traffic flow.

Renovations will also include new video boards on both the north and south ends of the stadium, along with a new public address system. The additional expansion of Maverik Stadium's seating capacity is also planned for the future.

Utah State's football stadium has largely gone without any upgrades to the existing structure during its 47-year existence. The seating capacity has been altered twice; once in 1980 with the addition of approximately 10,000 seats to the south bowl, and again in 1997 when roughly 4,000 chair back seats were installed to bring the present capacity to 25,513.

In 2005, the south end zone area was renovated, providing improved concessions and restroom facilities, as well as a widened concourse on the east side of the stadium. And in 2008, the three-story, 69,000-square foot Jim and Carol Laub Athletics-Academics Complex was completed in the north end zone, providing enhanced athletic and academic needs for all 16 of USU's varsity sports."

Utah State's student section is known as "the HURD".

Stadium history
 University Quad (1892–1912)
 Adams Field (1913–1929)
 Romney Stadium (original site) (1930–1967)
 Romney Stadium (current site) (1968–2015)
 Merlin Olsen Field at Maverik Stadium (2015–present)

Rivalries
Utah State has a number of both old and new rivals. Older rivals include Brigham Young University (Battle for the Old Wagon Wheel/Beehive Boot Trophy), the University of Utah (Battle of the Brothers/Beehive Boot Trophy), and the University of Wyoming (Bridger's Battle).

Newer rivalries include teams against whom the Aggies of Utah State play each year in the Mountain Division of the Mountain West Conference. These teams include Boise State, Air Force, Colorado State, University of Las Vegas Nevada, and (again) the University of Wyoming. In particular, a new in-division and in-conference rivalry exists with the Boise State Broncos (having relative close proximity to Utah State) and the Air Force Falcons (given the long-standing military tradition at both schools and USU's close proximity to Hill Air Force Base in Layton, Utah).

BYU

The Cougars and Aggies started playing in 1922. BYU and Utah State have met for the Old Wagon Wheel 58 times, dating back to 1948. BYU had beaten Utah State ten straight times before Utah State defeated BYU 31–16 on October 1, 2010. With the victory, Utah State reclaimed the Old Wagon Wheel for the first time since 1993. The Old Wagon Wheel returned to Logan on October 3, 2014, when the Aggies defeated BYU 35–20. BYU is often referred to in the local media as being the chief rival of Utah State University. It is the second oldest rivalry for both schools.

Current Record: 49–37–3; BYU Leads

Most Recent Game:

Utah

The Battle of the Brothers refers to the rivalry between Utah State and Utah. The two teams have a long-running football series, which, at 112 games, is tied for the seventh most-played rivalry in the Division I FBS football. The Battle of the Brothers is the oldest FBS Division I college football rivalry in the United States between two public universities in the same state. Both programs played the first game in their respective histories against each other in Logan on November 25, 1892, which game the Aggies won 12–0. The two teams played every year from 1944 to 2009, but the series took a two-year hiatus for the 2010 and 2011 seasons. On September 7, 2012, the Aggies snapped the 12-game losing streak beating Utah 27–20 (OT) in Logan. The game was not played in 2014. The series continued in 2015 at Rice-Eccles Stadium, with Utah winning 24–14. Since then, no future games have been scheduled.

Current Record: 79–29–4; Utah Leads

Most Recent Game:

Wyoming

Utah State and Wyoming first played in 1903, making the rivalry one of the oldest for both schools. Early on, the teams met annually as members of the Rocky Mountain Athletic Conference from 1916 to 1937 and later the Mountain States Conference from 1938 to 1961. The teams continued to play each other frequently from 1962 to 1978, before taking an extended hiatus until 2001. The rivalry was renewed on an annual basis when Utah State joined the Mountain West Conference for the 2013 season (in the same division as Wyoming), in a game now billed as "Bridger's Battle" after American frontiersman Jim Bridger. The trophy for the winning team is a .50-caliber Rocky Mountain Hawken rifle.

Current Record: 40–27–4; Utah State leads

Most Recent Game:

National Award winners

Outland Trophy

The Outland Trophy is awarded to the best college football interior lineman in the United States as adjudged by the Football Writers Association of America.

Walter Camp Man of the Year Award

The Walter Camp Man of the Year is given to the "Man of the Year" in the world of college football. The criteria for the award are "success, leadership, public service, integrity, and commitment to American heritage and Walter Camp's philosophy."

Pro Football Hall of Fame inductees

Merin Olsen was a 14× Pro Bowler (1962–1975), NFL Rookie of the Year (1962), named to the NFL 1960s All-Decade Team, NFL 1970s All-Decade Team, NFL 75th Anniversary All-Time Team, NFL 100th Anniversary All-Time Team and is enshrined in the St. Louis Football Ring of Fame. His No. 74 was retired by the Los Angeles Rams. He won the Bert Bell Award in 1974 as the leagues "Player of the Year.".

College Football Hall of Fame inductees

College Football Hall of Fame

Ralston was named head coach at Utah State University in 1959. In four years there, he compiled a 31–11–1 record and won two Skyline Conference championships. Ralston moved to Stanford University in 1963 and, over nine seasons, built a mark of 55–36–3. In his last two seasons, 1970–1971, Ralston's teams won two Pacific-8 titles and notched back-to-back Rose Bowl victories over Ohio State and Michigan, both of whom were undefeated coming into the Rose Bowl game. Under Ralston's tutelage, Stanford quarterback Jim Plunkett won the Heisman Trophy in 1970. John Ralston was inducted in the College Football Hall of Fame in 1992.

Merlin Olsen was first honored by the National Football Foundation in 1961, when he was chosen as one of the top scholar-athletes. He was an 1st Team Consensus All-America tackle at Utah State and winner of the Outland Trophy as the nation's best interior lineman. In 1980 Olsen was enshrined in the College Football Hall of Fame. He was the first to be a scholar-athlete winner and later a Hall of Famer. Olsen went on the play with the Los Angeles Rams. In both collegiate and pro play, he was known as a bruising, hard-hitting defensive lineman. Off the field Olsen was known to be an intelligent and compassionate scholar. Following his pro football days, Olsen went into television, starring in "The Little House on the Prairie", and then into sports broadcasting as a member of the NBC Sports. He was known as a 'Tough Guy' on the field, 'Mr. Nice Guy' off the field.

LaVell Edwards was an American football head coach for Brigham Young University (BYU).  With 257 career victories, he ranks as one of the most successful college football coaches of all time.  Among his many notable accomplishments, Edwards guided BYU to a national championship in 1984 and coached Heisman Trophy winner Ty Detmer in 1990.  
Edwards played football for Utah State University and earned a master's degree prior to coaching at BYU, where he also earned his doctorate.

All-Americans
 
 Elmer Ward, C- 1934 (NEA-1st)
 Kent Ryan, HB- 1936 (AAB-1st; WC-1st)
 Gary Kapp, DE- 1960 (INS-2nd)
 Merlin Olsen, DT- 1960 (AFCA-3rd; NEA-1st; FWAA-1st; UPI-3rd)
 Merlin Olsen, DT- 1961 Consensus 1st Team (AFCA-1st; NEA-1st; FWAA-1st; UPI-1st
 Lionel Aldridge, DL– 1962 (Hon. Men. All-American)
 Henry King, DB- 1966 (NEA-2nd; Time-1st; TSN-1st)
 Bill Staley, DT- 1967 (CP-1st; NEA-2nd; UPI-2nd; FN-1st; Time-1st; TSN-1st)
 Phil Olsen, DE- 1969 Consensus 1st Team (AP-1st; NEA-1st; UPI-1st; Time-1st, TSN-1st; WC-1st)
 Tony Adams, QB- 1972 (AP-2nd)
 Dave Manning, G- 1973 (AP-2nd)
 Louie Giammona, RB- 1974 (AP-3rd; UPI-2nd)
 Louie Giammona, RB- 1975 (AP-3rd)

Future non-conference opponents
Announced schedules as of September 11, 2021.

Notable players

OT – Len Rohde (1957–1959) Two-time all-Skyline Eight; 15-year NFL career.
DL – Merlin Olsen (1959–1961) 2-time and Consensus All-American, Outland Trophy winner (1961); 14 Pro Bowls
DL – Lionel Aldridge (1960–1962) Hon. Men. All-American (1962); 11-year NFL career, 2 Super Bowl rings with the Green Bay Packers
QB – Anthony Calvillo (1992–1993) 17-year CFL career including 3 Grey Cup Wins; 4-time CFL All-Star; CFL's Most Outstanding Player Award 2003, 2008, 2009, and all-time record holder for most passing yards in professional football history.
QB – Bill Munson (1964–1964) Played in 16 NFL seasons from 1964 to 1979 for five different teams, starting for the Detroit Lions through the late 1960s and early 1970s.
PK – Jim Turner (1961–1963) A QB in college, he kicked a then record 145 points in the 1968 regular NFL season, with a pro football record 34 field goals. Has one Super Bowl ring with the New York Jets, who defeated the Baltimore Colts in Super Bowl III. Played 9 seasons with the Denver Broncos, including Super Bowl XII against the Dallas Cowboys. Was 304 of 488 (62%) on field goals and 521 of 534 extra points, giving him 1,439 total points over his career. Inducted into the Denver Broncos Ring of Fame in 1988, and is all-time second team, American Football League.
RB – Altie Taylor (1966–1968) NCAA statistical champion for kickoff return average (1967); 8-year NFL career with Detroit and Houston.
DL – Phil Olsen (1967–1969) Consensus All-American (1969); 9-year NFL career.
OG – Dave Manning (1972–73) Two year starter at USU, Manning was All-American, 2nd Team his Senior year and was one of the main blockers for Aggie Running Back Louie Giammona.
QB – Bob Gagliano (1980) Played for 14 years in the NFL with eight teams, and one season with the Denver Gold of the United States Football League (USFL).
DE/R – Alan McMurray "Madpup" (1971–1973) Sophomore All-American – small's DE in nation 178 lbs, QB sack record (19.5), outstanding game against 1971 National Champs Nebraska (ESPN & Sports Illustrated's "team of the century") 13 tackles/9 assists/1 QB sack – Original designer of Aggie mascot
RB – Louie Giammona (1973–1975) 6-year NFL career.
PK – Alfred Knapp (1973–1974) Set several kicking records-2nd in nation, signed w/ Green Bay Packers
DB – Johndale Carty (1995–1998) played for the Atlanta Falcons of the NFL
TE – Chris Cooley (2000–2003) Led NCAA in TE receptions as a senior; NFL Pro Bowl (2007–2009) with the Washington Redskins
WR – Kevin Curtis (2001–2002)... 3rd team AP All-American (2001) Finished career as USU receptions leader. Has played for the St. Louis Rams and the Philadelphia Eagles. 
LB – LaVell Edwards (1949–1951) All-Mountain States (1950); Hall of Fame coach at Brigham Young University
QB – Eric Hipple (1976–1979) All-Pacific Coast; 10-year NFL career with the Detroit Lions
OG – Jim Hough (1974–1977) 2nd team AP All-American (1977), 9 years in NFL, all with Minnesota.
DL – Rulon Jones (1976–1979) 1st team AP All-American (1979); AFC Defensive Player of the Year (1986).
DL – Greg Kragen (1980–1983) 13-year NFL career; Pro Bowl, 3 Super Bowl rings
QB – Ron Lopez Arena Football League player
RB – Rick Parros (1976–1979) 6-year NFL career.
WR – Kevin Robinson (2003–2007) NCAA all-time leader in all-purpose yards per play (16.16; 6,479 yds in 401 career plays).
LB – Al Smith (1984–1986) Big West Defensive Player of the Year (1986), 2-time Honorable Mention All-American
OG – Rich Tylski (1990–1993) A 3-year starter at Utah State, Tylski signed a free agent contract upon graduation from USU with the New England Patriots in 1994 that led to a 10-year NFL career with New England (1994 & 2002), Jacksonville (1995–99), Pittsburgh (2000–2001) and Carolina (2003–2004).
RB – Emmett White (1996–2000) 3-year starter at USU, White was a two-time All Big West (1999–2000), All Independent (2001) and All American 3rd Team (2001). He also set an NCAA record for most all purpose yards in a game against New Mexico State in 2001 in which he rushed 34 times for 322 yards, caught seven passes for 134 yards and had return yardage of 122 yards for a fantastic 578 yards, beating the old NCAA record by 143 yards. He finished the year leading the NCAA with an average of 238.9 yards per game in all purpose yards.
OT – Donald Penn (2002–2006) NFL player
DB – Jarrett Bush (2004–2005) a free agent. In Super Bowl XLV, he had one interception, one hit on quarterback, one pass defended, and four solo tackles.
RB – Robert Turbin (2007–2011) a running back for the Seattle Seahawks.
LB – Bobby Wagner (2008–2011) Former starting middle linebacker for the Seattle Seahawks. He set the club record for tackles by a rookie with 140 and ranked second among all rookies in 2012. Currently a free agent.
LB – Kyler Fackrell NFL player
WR – Kendal Smith NFL player
LS – Patrick Scales, NFL player
QB – Mike Affleck, American football player
OL – Matt Hanousek, American football player
CB – Tay Glover-Wright, American football player. He appeared in 27 games, starting 11, during his time at Utah State and recorded career totals of 69 tackles, 10 pass breakups, 1 sack, 1 forced fumble and 1 fumble recovery. He had 105 rushing yards on 20 attempts as well.
QB - Jordan Love, Drafted as the 26th pick in the 1st round of the 2020 NFL draft by the Green Bay Packers.

References

External links

 

 
American football teams established in 1892
1892 establishments in Utah Territory